Since its inception in 1954, the Church of Scientology has been involved in a number of controversies, including its stance on psychiatry, Scientology's legitimacy as a religion, the Church's aggressive attitude in dealing with its perceived enemies and critics, allegations of mistreatment of members, and predatory financial practices; for example, the high cost of religious training:191 and perceived exploitative practices. When mainstream media outlets have reported alleged abuses, representatives of the church have tended to deny such allegations.

Secrecy
The church maintains strict control over the use of its symbols, names and religious texts. Although U.S. intellectual property law allows for "fair use" of material for commentary, parody, educational purposes, etc., critics of the church such as Gerry Armstrong have argued the church unfairly and illegally uses the legal system to suppress "fair" uses, including suppressing any mention of the space opera aspects of the religion, including the story of Xenu.:371-383

One example critics cited is a 1995 lawsuit against the Washington Post newspaper et al. The Religious Technology Center (RTC), the corporation controlling L. Ron Hubbard's copyrighted materials, sued to prevent a Post reporter from describing church teachings at the center of another lawsuit, claiming copyright infringement, trade secret misappropriation, and the circulation of their "advanced technology" teachings would cause "devastating, cataclysmic spiritual harm" to those not prepared. In her judgment in favor of the Post, Judge Leonie Brinkema noted:

Public absence of Michele Miscavige

Actress Leah Remini, a former Scientologist and vocal critic of the organization, filed a missing person report regarding Michele Miscavige, wife of David Miscavige, with the Los Angeles Police Department (LAPD) in 2013. According to a story in The Los Angeles Times based on information from an anonymous LAPD source, the LAPD contacted Miscavige and subsequently closed the case.

Scientology and psychiatry

There have been a number of controversies between Scientology and psychiatry since the founding of the Church of Scientology in 1952. Scientology is publicly, and often vehemently, opposed to both psychiatry and psychology. Scientologists view psychiatry as a barbaric and corrupt profession and encourage alternative care based on spiritual healing. According to the Church of Scientology, psychiatry has a long history of improper and abusive care. The group's views have been disputed, criticized and condemned by experts in the medical and scientific community and been a source of public controversy.

The Church of Scientology's objection to secular ideas about mental health are religious in nature, based on the conviction that humans are essentially divine beings who have been marred by negative experiences acquired over several lifetimes. Scientology also purports that the secular perception of what is mentally normal is not based on science, a contradiction to the claims of psychiatry and psychology.

The Church founded an anti-psychiatry organization called Citizens Commission on Human Rights (CCHR), which operates a museum in Hollywood, California, called Psychiatry: An Industry of Death. The museum is dedicated to criticizing what it describes as "an industry driven entirely by profit". It has a variety of displays and exhibits that highlight physical psychiatric treatments, such as restraints, psychoactive drugs, electroconvulsive therapy and psychosurgery (including lobotomy, a procedure abandoned in the 1960s).

"Attack the Attacker" policy
Scientology has a reputation for hostile action toward anyone who criticizes it in a public forum; executives within the organization have proclaimed Scientology is "not a turn-the-other-cheek religion". Journalists, politicians, former Scientologists and various anti-cult groups have made accusations of wrongdoing against Scientology since the 1960s, and Scientology has targeted these critics—almost without exception—for retaliation, in the form of lawsuits and public counter-accusations of personal wrongdoing. Many of Scientology's critics have also reported they were subjected to threats and harassment in their private lives.

The organization's actions reflect a formal policy for dealing with criticism instituted by L. Ron Hubbard, called "attack the attacker". Hubbard codified this policy in the latter half of the 1960s in response to government investigations into the organization. In 1966, Hubbard wrote a criticism of the organization's behavior and noted the "correct procedure" for attacking enemies of Scientology:

Scientology and Me

In 2007 a BBC documentary on Scientology by reporter John Sweeney came under scrutiny by Scientologists. Sweeney alleged "While making our BBC Panorama film Scientology and Me I have been shouted at, spied on, had my hotel invaded at midnight, denounced as a 'bigot' by star Scientologists, brain-washed—that is how it felt to me—in a mock up of a Nazi-style torture chamber and chased round the streets of Los Angeles by sinister strangers". This resulted in a video being distributed by Scientologists of a shouting match between Sweeney and Scientology spokesman Tommy Davis. The church has reportedly released a DVD accusing the BBC of organising a demonstration outside a Scientology office in London, during which "terrorist death threats" were made against Scientologists. The BBC described the allegations as "clearly laughable and utter nonsense". Sandy Smith, the BBC programme's producer, commented the church of Scientology has "no way of dealing with any kind of criticism at all".

Fair Game

Hubbard detailed his rules for attacking critics in a number of policy letters, including one often quoted by critics as "the Fair Game policy". This allowed those who had been declared enemies of the Church, called "suppressive persons" (SPs), "May be deprived of property or injured by any means...May be tricked, sued or lied to or destroyed". (taken from HCOPL October 18, 1967 Issue IV, Penalties for Lower Conditions)

The aforementioned policy was canceled and replaced by HCOPL July 21, 1968, Penalties for Lower Conditions. The wordings "May be deprived of property or injured by any means... May be tricked, sued or lied to or destroyed", are not found in this reference. Scientology critics argue only the term but not the practice was removed. To support this contention, they refer to "HCO Policy Letter of October 21, 1968" which says, "The practice of declaring people FAIR GAME will cease. FAIR GAME may not appear on any Ethics Order. It causes bad public relations. This P/L does not cancel any policy on the treatment or handling of a SP."

According to a book by Omar Garrison, HCOPL March 7, 1969, was created under pressure from the government of New Zealand. Garrison quotes from the HCOPL, "We are going in the direction of mild ethics and involvement with the Society". Garrison then states, "It was partly on the basis of these policy reforms that the New Zealand Commission of Inquiry recommended that no legislative action be taken against Scientology". The source of Omar Garrison for this is most likely the Dumbleton-Powles Report, additional data and quotations are found in this report.

In 1977, top officials of Scientology's "Guardian's Office", an internal security force run by Hubbard's wife, Mary Sue Hubbard, admitted that fair game was policy in the GO. (U.S. v. Kember, Budlong Sentencing Memorandum – Undated, 1981).

In separate cases in 1979 and 1984, attorneys for Scientology argued the Fair Game policy was in fact a core belief of Scientology and as such deserved protection as religious expression.

"Dead agenting"
In the 1970s, Hubbard continued to codify the policy of "attacking the attacker" and assigned a term to be used frequently within Scientology: "dead agenting". Used as a verb, "dead agenting" is described by Hubbard as a technique for countering negative accusations against Scientology by diverting the critical statements and making counter-accusations against the accuser; in other words, to "attack the attacker". Hubbard defined the PR (public relations) policy on "dead agenting" in a 1974 bulletin:

The phrase comes from a misunderstanding of the chapter on espionage in The Art of War. The Scientology-sponsored website religiousfreedomwatch.org features depictions of so-called "anti-religious extremists", most of them critics of Scientology. Featuring photos of the critics and claimed evidence of their personal wrongdoing (sometimes very vague; for example: "Documentation received by Religious Freedom Watch shows that [Kristi] Wachter paid an individual to carry out a specific project for her, and also instructed this individual to lie about what he was doing in case he was caught"). The "Religious Freedom Watch" site is often cited by alt.religion.scientology users as a contemporary example of "dead agenting".

Dead agenting has also been carried out by flier campaigns against some critics—using so-called "DA fliers". Bonnie Woods, an ex-member who began counseling people involved with Scientology and their families, became a target along with her husband in 1993 when the Church of Scientology started a leaflet operation denouncing her as a "hate campaigner" with demonstrators outside their home and around East Grinstead. After a long battle of libel suits, in 1999, the church agreed to issue an apology and to pay £55,000 damages and £100,000 in legal costs to the Woods.

R2-45

"R2-45" is the name given by L. Ron Hubbard to what he described as "an enormously effective process for exteriorization but its use is frowned upon by this society at this time". In Scientology doctrine, exteriorization refers to the separation of the thetan (soul) from the body. According to the author Stewart Lamont, Hubbard defined R2-45 as a process by which exteriorization could be produced by shooting a person in the head with a .45 revolver.

While no "R2-45 letters" have been published, orders to use R2-45 on specific individuals were published in a prominent Scientology magazine. On March 6, 1968, Hubbard issued an internal memo titled "Racket Exposed", in which he denounced twelve people as "Enemies of mankind, the planet and all life", and ordered "Any Sea Org member contacting any of them is to use Auditing Process R2-45." The memo was subsequently reproduced, with another name added, in the Church of Scientology's internal journal, The Auditor. Another four people were named in a second R2-45 order published in The Auditor later in 1968.

Criminal convictions of members

Much of the controversy surrounding Scientology is reflected in the long list of legal incidents associated with the organization including the criminal convictions of core members of the Scientology organization.

In 1978, a number of Scientologists, including L. Ron Hubbard's wife Mary Sue Hubbard (who was second in command in the organization at the time), were convicted of perpetrating what was at the time the largest incident of domestic espionage in the history of the United States, called "Operation Snow White". This involved infiltrating, wiretapping, and stealing documents from the offices of Federal attorneys and the Internal Revenue Service. The judge who convicted Mary Sue Hubbard and ten accomplices described their attempt to plead freedom of religion in defense:

Eleven church staff members, including Mary Sue Hubbard and other highly placed officials, pleaded guilty or were convicted in federal court based on evidence seized in the raids and received sentences from two to six years (some suspended).

Other noteworthy incidents involving criminal accusations and prosecutions against the Church of Scientology include:

 On January 4, 1963, more than one hundred E-meters were seized by U.S. marshals at the "Founding Church of Scientology" building, now known as the L. Ron Hubbard House, located in Washington, D.C. The church was accused of making false claims that the devices effectively treated some 70 percent of all physical and mental illness. The FDA also charged that the devices did not bear adequate directions for treating the conditions for which they were recommended. Upon appeal, the E-meters were returned, with the direction that they should be used only in "bona fide religious counseling", and that all meters and referring literature must include a label disclaiming any medical benefits. In the decision, the court gave recognition to Scientology's "constitutional right to protection from the government's excessive entanglement with religion" as written by James R. Lewis, in Scientology.
 In 1978, L. Ron Hubbard was convicted in absentia by French authorities of engaging in fraud, fined 35,000 francs, and sentenced to four years in prison. The head of the French Church of Scientology was convicted at the same trial and given a suspended one-year prison sentence.
 The FBI raid on the Church's headquarters revealed documentation that detailed Scientology actions against various critics of the organization. Among these documents was a plan to frame Gabe Cazares, the mayor of Clearwater, Florida, with a staged hit-and-run accident. Also, plans were made to discredit the skeptical organization CSICOP by spreading rumors that it was a front for the CIA, and a project called "Operation Freakout" which aimed at ruining the life of Paulette Cooper, author of The Scandal of Scientology, an early book that had been critical of the movement.
 In 1988, the government of Spain arrested Scientology president Heber Jentzsch and ten other members of the organization on various charges including illicit association, coercion, fraud, and labor law violations. Jentzsch jumped bail, leaving Spain and returning to the United States after Scientology paid a bail bond of approximately $1 million, and he has not returned to the country since. Scientology fought the charges in court for fourteen years, until the case was finally dismissed in 2002.
 The Church of Scientology is the only religious organization in Canada to be convicted on the charge of breaching the public trust: The Queen v. Church of Scientology of Toronto, et al. (1992)
 In France, several officials of the Church of Scientology were convicted of embezzlement in 2001. The Church was listed as a "dangerous cult" in a parliamentary report. In May 2009, a trial commenced in France against Scientology, accusing it of organised fraud. The case focused on a complaint by a woman who says that after being offered a free personality test, she was pressured into paying large sums of money. The church is regarded as a sect in France. The result of the trial was that two branches of the organization and several of its leaders have been found guilty of fraud and fined. Alain Rosenberg, the group's head in France, received a two-year suspended jail sentence.
 The Church of Scientology long considered the Cult Awareness Network (CAN) as one of its most important enemies, and many Scientology publications during the 1980s and 1990s cast CAN (and its spokesperson at the time, Cynthia Kisser) in an unfriendly light, accusing the cult-watchdog organization of various criminal activities. After CAN was forced into bankruptcy and taken over by Scientologists in the late 1990s, Scientology proudly proclaimed this as one of its greatest victories.
In Belgium, after a judicial investigation since 1997, a trial against the organization was due to begin in 2008. Charges include formation of a criminal organization, the unlawful exercise of medicine, and fraud.
In the United Kingdom the church has been accused of "grooming" City of London Police officers with gifts worth thousands of pounds.
In Australia, Scientology has been temporarily banned in the 1960s in three out of six states; the use of the E-meter was similarly banned in Victoria. In Victoria, Scientology was investigated by the state government. In the conclusion to his report written as part of this investigation, Kevin Victor Anderson, Q.C. stated "Scientology is a delusional belief system, based on fiction and fallacies and propagated by falsehood and deception".
The prosecution had asked for the Church to be banned, but a recent change in legislation made this impossible. The case had been brought by two ex-members who said they had been pressured into spending large amounts of money on Scientology courses and other services. Commenting on the verdict, the plaintiffs' attorney said, "It's the first time in France that the entity of the Church of Scientology is condemned for fraud as an organized gang". A Scientology spokesperson likened the judgment to "an Inquisition for modern times" and said the Church would appeal.

Treatment of members

In 2007, a 25-year-old woman from Sydney was charged with murdering her father and sister and seriously injuring her mother. Her parents had prevented her from seeking the psychiatric treatment she needed because of their Scientology beliefs.

In 2012, Debbie Cook, who ran the "spiritual Mecca" for seventeen years, came forward and accused the church of repeated accounts of "screaming, slapping" and being "made to stand in a trash and water's poured over you" in efforts to confess her sins. This was all done in "The Hole", located at Scientology's International base in Hemet, California. She claims that she was taken there against her will and forced to stay for seven weeks. The church states that she "voluntarily" participated in their program of "religious discipline". Leah Remini: Scientology and the Aftermath is a 2016–2017 A&E documentary series that investigates abuses of the Church of Scientology by interviewing of former members.

Death of Lisa McPherson

The most widely publicized death of one of the organization's members was that of 36-year-old Lisa McPherson while in the care of Scientologists at the Scientology-owned Fort Harrison Hotel, in Clearwater, Florida, in 1995. McPherson, at the time, was displaying symptoms suggesting she was struggling with mental illness; in one case, she removed all of her clothes after being involved in a minor traffic accident, later remarking she had done so in hopes of obtaining counseling. The Church, however, intervened to prevent McPherson from receiving psychiatric treatment and to keep her in Church custody. Records show that she was then placed in a Scientology program, the Introspection Rundown, which was forced isolation used to handle a psychotic episode. Weeks later, she was pronounced dead on arrival at a hospital. The autopsy identified multiple hematomas (bruises), an abrasion on the nose, and lesions that were consistent with "insect/animal bites". An autopsy showed that she had died of a pulmonary embolism.

Florida authorities filed criminal charges against the Church of Scientology, who denied any responsibility for McPherson's death and vigorously contested the charges. The prosecuting attorneys ultimately dropped the criminal case. After four years, a $100 million civil lawsuit filed by Lisa McPherson's family was settled in 2004. The suit resulted in an injunction against the distribution of a film critical of Scientology, The Profit, which the Church claimed was meant to influence the jury. The terms of the settlement were sealed by the court.

Death of Elli Perkins

Another crime that received substantial news coverage involved the death of Elli Perkins. This included an installment on the CBS investigative news program 48 Hours.

Perkins was a mother of two, a professional glass artist, and a Scientologist who lived in Western New York. She was a senior auditor at the Church of Scientology in Buffalo, New York. When her then 24-year-old son Jeremy began to show strange and disturbing behavior, Elli did not seek out psychiatric care but used treatment in accordance with Scientology. Scientologists believe that psychiatry "doesn't work."

First, the family sent Jeremy to Scientology's Sea Org in California. He returned home some months later because Sea Org had not helped. Found trespassing outside the University at Buffalo on August 14, 2001, Jeremy was arrested and remanded to a local hospital after a court-ordered psychiatric exam confirmed that he had a diagnosis of schizophrenia.

Elli Perkins later convinced the court to release her son into her custody so she could seek alternatives to psychiatry. She also refused any treatment with anti-psychotic medications.  Defense attorney John Nuchereno said that Jeremy's condition declined over the summer of 2002. He was no longer able to work in the family business.  The Church of Scientology ceased efforts to cure Jeremy and classified him as a level III "Potential Trouble Source".

In the fall of 2002, the family consulted Dr. Conrad Maulfair, an osteopathic physician and Scientologist. Maulfair concluded that Jeremy needed to be purged of certain chemical toxins in his body. Maulfair said he needed to be "energized" through vitamin therapy.

Jeremy became suspicious of his mother; he thought the vitamins were poisoning him. In February 2003, Elli took Jeremy to see Albert Brown, a self-taught "natural healer".  Elli planned to send Jeremy to live with Brown for treatment.  He was to leave for Brown's on March 13, 2003, but days beforehand began to act more aggressively. On the 13th, after a shower he retrieved a steak knife and tried to slit his wrists. Unsuccessful, Jeremy found his mother in the kitchen and attacked her as she spoke to a friend on the phone. Autopsy reports showed that Elli Perkins was stabbed 77 times.

Jeremy was charged with second degree murder but found not responsible by reason of mental disease. On January 29, 2004, after NY State Office of Mental Health exams, he was assessed "Dangerously Mentally Ill" and committed to a secure facility.  Jeremy is on psychotropic medications, which court psychiatrists state have not cured him, but have stabilized his condition.

In March 2006, an advertisement in LA Weekly blamed the Church of Scientology for Perkins' violent death. The 48 Hours segment on Perkins' death aired on October 28, 2006. Afterward, CBS reported they had received complaints from Scientologists.

Death of Noah Lottick
Noah Lottick was an American student of Russian studies who committed suicide on May 11, 1990, by jumping from a 10th-floor hotel window, clutching his only remaining money in his hands. After his death, a controversy arose revolving around his parents' concern over his membership in the Church of Scientology.

Noah Lottick had taken Scientology courses, for which he paid . Lottick's friends and family remarked that after taking these courses he began to act strangely. They stated to Time magazine that he told them that his Scientologist teachers were telepathic, and that his father's heart attack was purely psychosomatic.  His parents said that he visited their home five days before his death, claiming they were spreading "false rumors" about him.

Lottick's suicide was profiled in a Time cover story that was highly critical of Scientology, "The Thriving Cult of Greed and Power", which received the Gerald Loeb Award, and later appeared in Reader's Digest.

Lottick's father, Dr. Edward Lottick, stated that his initial impression of Scientology was that it was similar to Dale Carnegie's techniques. However, after his son's death, his opinion was that the organization is a "school for psychopaths".  He blamed Scientology for his son's death, although no direct connection was determined.  After Dr. Lottick's remarks were published in the media, the Church of Scientology haggled with him over  that Noah had allegedly paid to the Church and not utilized for services.  The Church claimed Lottick had intended this to be a donation.

The Church of Scientology sued Richard Behar and Time magazine for $416 million. Dr. and Mrs. Lottick submitted affidavits affirming "the accuracy of each statement in the article", and stating that Dr. Lottick had "concluded that Scientology therapies were manipulations". They said that no Scientology staff members attended the funeral of their son. All counts against Behar and Time were later dismissed. Lottick's father cited his son's suicide as his motivation for researching cults, in his article describing a survey of physicians that he presented to the Pennsylvania State Medical Society.

The Church of Scientology issued a press release denying any responsibility for Lottick's suicide.  Spokesperson Mike Rinder was quoted in the St. Petersburg Times as saying that Lottick had an argument with his parents four days before his death.  Rinder stated, "I think Ed Lottick should look in the mirror ... I think Ed Lottick made his son's life intolerable."

Brainwashing

The Church of Scientology is frequently accused by critics of employing brainwashing.

One alleged example of the Church's possible brainwashing tactics is the Rehabilitation Project Force, to which church staff are assigned to work off alleged wrongdoings under conditions that many critics characterize as degrading. Some of these allegations are presented in Stephen Kent's Brainwashing in Scientology's Rehabilitation Project Force (RPF).

L. Ron Hubbard is believed to have authored The Brainwashing Manual.

The Anderson Report
The final results of the Anderson Report in 1965 declared:
The Board is not concerned to find that the scientology techniques are brainwashing techniques as practiced, so it is understood, in some communist-controlled countries. Scientology techniques are, nevertheless, a kind of brainwashing...The astonishing feature of Scientology is that its techniques and propagation resemble very closely those set out in a book entitled Brain-washing, advertised and sold by the HASI.

Disconnection

The Church of Scientology has been criticized for their practice of "disconnection" in which Scientologists are directed to sever all contact with family members or friends who criticize the faith. Critics including ex-members and relatives of existing members say that this practice has divided many families. The disconnection policy is considered by critics to be further evidence that the Church is a cult. By making its members entirely dependent upon a social network entirely within the organization, critics assert that Scientologists are kept from exposure to critical perspectives on the church and are put in a situation that makes it extremely difficult for members to leave the church, since apostates will be shunned by the Church and have already been cut off from family and friends.

The Church of Scientology acknowledges that its members are strongly discouraged from associating with "enemies of Scientology", and likens the disconnection policy to the practice of shunning in religions such as the Amish. However, there is a consensus of religious scholars who oppose Scientology's practice:
"I just think it would be better for all concerned if they just let them go ahead and get out and everyone goes their own way, and not make such a big deal of it, the policy hurts everybody." J. Gordon Melton, Institute for the Study of American Religion, Santa Barbara, California.

"It has to do with feeling threatened because you're not that big. You do everything you can to keep unity in the group." F.K. Flinn, Washington University in St. Louis.

"Some people I've talked to, they just wanted to go on with their lives and they wanted to be in touch with their daughter or son or parent. The shunning was just painful. And I don't know what it was accomplishing. And the very terms they use are scary, aren't they?" Newton Maloney, Fuller Theological Seminary, Pasadena, California.

Use of donations and preferential treatment of Scientologist celebrities
Andre Tabayoyon, a former Scientologist and Sea Org staffer, testified in a 1994 affidavit that money from not-for-profit Scientology organizations and labor from those organizations (including the Rehabilitation Project Force) had gone to provide special facilities for Scientology celebrities, which were not available to other Scientologists:A Sea Org staffer...was taken along to do personal cooking for Tom Cruise and  Miscavige at the expense of Scientology not for profit religious organizations. This left only 3 cooks at Gold  to cook for 800 people three times a day... apartment cottages were built for the use of John Travolta, Kirstie Alley, Edgar Winter, Priscilla Presley, and other Scientology celebrities who are carefully prevented from finding out the real truth about the Scientology organization ... Miscavige decided to redo the meadow in beautiful flowers; Tens of thousands of dollars were spent on the project so that  Cruise and  Kidman could romp there. However, Miscavige inspected the project and didn't like it. So the whole meadow was plowed up, destroyed, replowed and sown with plain grass.Tabayoyon's account of the planting of the meadow was supported by another former Scientologist, Maureen Bolstad, who said that a couple of dozen Scientologists including herself were put to work on a rainy night through dawn on the project. "We were told that we needed to plant a field and that it was to help Tom impress Nicole... but for some mysterious reason it wasn't considered acceptable by Mr. Miscavige. So the project was rejected and they redid it".

Legitimacy of Scientology as a religion

The nature of Scientology is hotly debated in many countries. The Church of Scientology pursues an extensive public relations campaign arguing Scientology is a bona fide religion. The organization cites a number of studies and experts who support their position. Critics point out most cited studies were commissioned by Scientology to produce the desired results.

Many countries (including Belgium, Canada, Finland, France, Germany, Greece, Ireland, Israel, Mexico, Russia, the United Kingdom), while not prohibiting or limiting the activities of the Church of Scientology, have rejected its applications for tax-exempt, charitable status or recognition as a religious organization; it has been variously judged to be a commercial enterprise or a dangerous cult.

Scientology is legally accepted as a religion in the United States and Australia, and enjoys the constitutional protections afforded to religious practice in each country. In October 1993, the U.S. Internal Revenue Service recognized the Church as an "organization operated exclusively for religious and charitable purposes". The Church offers the tax exemption as proof that it is a religion. (This subject is examined in the article on the Church of Scientology).

In 1982, the High Court of Australia ruled the State Government of Victoria lacked the right to declare the Church of Scientology was not a religion. The Court found the issue of belief to be the central feature of religion, regardless of the presence of charlatanism: "Charlatanism is a necessary price of religious freedom, and if a self-proclaimed teacher persuades others to believe in a religion which he propounds, lack of sincerity or integrity on his part is not incompatible with the religious character of the beliefs, practices and observances accepted by his followers."

Other countries to have recognized Scientology as a religion include Spain, Portugal, Italy, Sweden, and New Zealand. The debate continues until today, with a new generation of critics continuing to question Scientology's legitimacy as a religion.

L. Ron Hubbard and starting a religion for money

While the oft-cited rumor Hubbard made a bar bet with Robert A. Heinlein he could start a cult is unproven, many witnesses have reported Hubbard making statements in their presence starting a religion would be a good way to make money. These statements have led many to believe Hubbard hid his true intentions and was motivated solely by potential financial rewards.

Editor Sam Merwin, for example, recalled a meeting: "I always knew he was exceedingly anxious to hit big money—he used to say he thought the best way to do it would be to start a cult." (December 1946) Writer and publisher Lloyd Arthur Eshbach reported Hubbard saying "I'd like to start a religion. That's where the money is." Writer Theodore Sturgeon reported Hubbard made a similar statement at the Los Angeles Science Fantasy Society. Likewise, writer Sam Moskowitz reported in an affidavit during an Eastern Science Fiction Association meeting on November 11, 1948, Hubbard had said "You don't get rich writing science fiction. If you want to get rich, you start a religion." Milton A. Rothman also reported to his son Tony Rothman he heard Hubbard make exactly that claim at a science fiction convention. In 1998, an A&E documentary titled Inside Scientology shows Lyle Stuart reporting Hubbard stated repeatedly to make money, "you start a religion."

According to The Visual Encyclopedia of Science Fiction, ed. Brian Ash, Harmony Books, 1977:...[Hubbard] began making statements to the effect that any writer who really wished to make money should stop writing and develop [a] religion, or devise a new psychiatric method. Harlan Ellison's version (Time Out, UK, No 332) is that Hubbard is reputed to have told [John W.] Campbell, "I'm going to invent a religion that's going to make me a fortune. I'm tired of writing for a penny a word". Sam Moskowitz, a chronicler of science fiction, has reported that he himself heard Hubbard make a similar statement, but there is no first-hand evidence.

An article by Professor Benjamin Beith-Hallahmi documents the secular aspects of Scientology from Scientology's own writings.

Free Zone suppression

The Church has taken steps to suppress the Free Zone, the term for a variety of groups and individuals who practice Scientology outside the strictures of the Church of Scientology proper, and shut down dissenters when possible. The CoS has used copyright and trademark laws to attack various Free Zone groups. Accordingly, the Free Zone avoids the use of officially trademarked Scientology words, including 'Scientology' itself. In 2000, the Religious Technology Center unsuccessfully attempted to gain the Web domain www.scientologie.org from the World Intellectual Property Organization, in a legal action against the Free Zone. Skeptic Magazine described the Free Zone as: "...a group founded by ex-Scientologists to promote L. Ron Hubbard's ideas independent of the COS [Church of Scientology]." A Miami Herald article wrote that ex-Scientologists joined the Free Zone because they felt that Church of Scientology leadership had: "...strayed from Hubbard's original teachings." One Free Zone Scientologist identified as "Safe" was quoted in Salon as saying: "The Church of Scientology does not want its control over its members to be found out by the public and it doesn't want its members to know that they can get scientology outside of the Church of Scientology."

Litigation as harassment of critics

In the past many critics of Scientology have claimed they were harassed by frivolous and vexatious lawsuits.

Paulette Cooper was falsely accused of felony charges as she had been framed by the Church of Scientology's Guardian's Office. Furthermore, her personal life had been intruded upon by Scientologists who had attempted to kill her and/or draw her to suicide in a covert plan known as Operation Freakout brought to light after FBI investigations into other matters (See Operation Snow White).

A prominent example of litigation of its critics is the Church of Scientology's $416 million libel lawsuit s:Church of Scientology v. Behar against Time Warner as a result of their publication of a highly critical magazine article "The Thriving Cult of Greed and Power" by Richard Behar. A public campaign by the Church of Scientology accordingly ensued in an attempt to defame this Time Magazine publication. (See Church of Scientology's response)

Gareth Alan Cales is being harassed by the Church of Scientology, including false charges against him and his friends.

Similarly, the Church of Scientology's legal battle with Gerry Armstrong in Church of Scientology v. Gerald Armstrong spanned two decades and involved a $10 million claim against Armstrong.

Personality tests

In 2008, the 20-year-old daughter of Olav Gunnar Ballo, a Norwegian member of parliament, had taken a personality test organized by Scientologists in Nice, and received very negative feedback from it. A few hours later she committed suicide. French police started an investigation of the Scientology church. In the wake of the Ballo suicide linked to the personality test, the spokesman for the church in Norway called the link at accusation deeply unfair, and pointing out that the daughter had previously suffered eating disorders and psychiatric troubles.

The personality test has been condemned by the psychologist Rudy Myrvang. He called the test a recruitment tool, aimed at breaking down a person so that the Scientologists can build the test-taker back up.

Treatment of Scientologists in Germany

Based on the 1993 IRS decision granting Scientology tax-exempt status, the U.S. Department of State formally criticized Germany for discriminating against Scientologists and began to note Scientologists' complaints of harassment and discrimination in its annual Human Rights Reports, starting from the 1993 report. Since then, the U.S. Department of State has repeatedly expressed its concerns over the violation of Scientologists' individual rights posed by "sect filters", whereby potential employees are required to divulge any association with Scientology before they are considered for a job. It has also warned that companies and artists associated with Scientology may be subject to "government-approved discrimination and boycotts" in Germany. Past targets of such boycotts have included Tom Cruise and jazz pianist Chick Corea.

In 1997, an open letter to then-German Chancellor Helmut Kohl, published as a newspaper advertisement in the International Herald Tribune, drew parallels between the "organized oppression" of Scientologists in Germany and Nazi policies espoused by Germany in the 1930s. The letter was signed by Dustin Hoffman, Goldie Hawn, and a number of other Hollywood celebrities and executives. Commenting on the matter, a spokesman for the U.S. Department of State criticized Germany's treatment of Scientologists and said that Scientologists were indeed discriminated against in Germany, but condemned any comparisons of this treatment to the Nazis' treatment of Jews as extremely inappropriate, an opinion echoed by the United Nations Special Rapporteur on human rights.

German officials sharply rejected the accusations. They said that Germany guarantees the freedom of religion, but characterized Scientology as a profit-making enterprise, rather than a religion, and emphasized that precisely because of Germany's Nazi past, Germany took a determined stance against all "radical cults and sects, including right-wing Nazi groups", and not just against Scientology. According to a 1997 Time magazine article, most Germans consider Scientology a subversive organization, with pollsters reporting 70% popular support for banning Scientology in Germany.

In late 1997, the United States granted asylum to a German Scientologist, Antje Victore, who claimed she would be subject to religious persecution in her homeland. In 2000, the German Stern magazine published a report asserting that several rejection letters which the woman had submitted as part of her asylum application—ostensibly from potential employers who were rejecting her because she was a Scientologist—had in fact been written by fellow Scientologists at her request and that of the Office of Special Affairs and that she was in personal financial trouble and about to go on trial for tax evasion at the time she applied for asylum. On a 2000 visit to Clearwater, Florida, Ursula Caberta of the Scientology Task Force for the Hamburg Interior Authority likewise alleged that the asylum case had been part of an "orchestrated effort" by Scientology undertaken "for political gain", and "a spectacular abuse of the U.S. system". German expatriate Scientologists resident in Clearwater, in turn, accused Caberta of stoking a "hate campaign" in Germany that had "ruined the lives and fortunes of scores of Scientologists" and maintained that Scientologists had not "exaggerated their plight for political gain in the United States". Mark Rathbun, a top Church of Scientology official, said that although Scientology had not orchestrated the case, "there would have been nothing improper if it had".

Scientology and Wikipedia

In an effort to adhere to Wikipedia policy, the Arbitration Committee of the English Wikipedia decided in late-May 2009 to restrict editing from Church of Scientology IP addresses, to prevent self-serving edits by editors within CoS-administered networks. A "host of anti-Scientologist editors" were topic-banned as well. The committee concluded that both sides had "gamed policy" and resorted to "battlefield tactics", with articles on living persons being the "worst casualties".

Church of Scientology's response to criticism

Scientology's response to accusations of criminal behavior has been twofold; the church is under attack by an organized conspiracy, and each of the church's critics is hiding a private criminal past. In the first instance, the Church of Scientology has repeatedly stated that it is engaged in an ongoing battle against a massive, worldwide conspiracy whose sole purpose is to "destroy the Scientology religion." Thus, aggressive measures and legal actions are the only way the church has been able to survive in a hostile environment; they sometimes liken themselves to the early Mormons who took up arms and organized militia to defend themselves from persecution.

The church asserts that the core of the organized anti-Scientology movement is the psychiatric profession, in league with deprogrammers and certain government bodies (including elements within the FBI and the government of Germany.) These conspirators have allegedly attacked Scientology since the earliest days of the church, with the shared goal of creating a docile, mind-controlled population. As an official Scientology website explains:

To understand the forces ranged against L. Ron Hubbard, in this war he never started, it is necessary to gain a cursory glimpse of the old and venerable science of psychiatry-which was actually none of the aforementioned. As an institution, it dates back to shortly before the turn of the century; it is certainly not worthy of respect by reason of age or dignity; and it does not meet any known definition of a science, what with its hodgepodge of unproven theories that have never produced any result-except an ability to make the unmanageable and mutinous more docile and quiet, and turn the troubled into apathetic souls beyond the point of caring. That it promotes itself as a healing profession is a misrepresentation. Its mission is to control.

On the other hand, L. Ron Hubbard has proclaimed that all critics of Scientology are criminals. Hubbard wrote on numerous occasions that all of Scientology's opponents are seeking to hide their own criminal histories, and the proper course of action to stop these attacks is to "expose" the hidden crimes of the attackers. The Church of Scientology does not deny that it vigorously seeks to "expose" its critics and enemies; it maintains that all of its critics have criminal histories, and they encourage hatred and "bigotry" against Scientology. Hubbard's belief that all critics of Scientology are criminals was summarized in a policy letter written in 1967:

Now get this as a technical fact, not a hopeful idea. Every time we have investigated the background of a critic of Scientology we have found crimes for which that person or group could be imprisoned under existing law. We do not find critics of Scientology who do not have criminal pasts. Over and over we prove this. -- Critics of Scientology, "Hubbard Communications Office Policy Letter", 5 November 1967.

Scientology claims that it continues to expand and prosper despite all efforts to prevent it from growing; critics claim that the Church's own statistics contradict its story of continuing growth.

The Church of Scientology has published a number of responses to criticism available online.

Analyses of Scientology's counter-accusations and actions against its critics are available on a number of websites, including the critical archive Operation Clambake.

On January 22, 2013, attorneys for the organization, as well as some of its members, reacted toward the CNN News Group, threatening legal action for its airing of a story covering the release of a book published by Lawrence Wright, entitled Going Clear: Scientology, Hollywood, and the Prison of Belief, published earlier the same year. CNN News Group then chose to publish the correspondence, with confidential information redacted, on its web site. The threats were not followed up by lawsuits.

See also

 A Piece of Blue Sky (book)
 Bare-Faced Messiah (book)
 Believe What You Like (book)
 Brain-Washing (book)
 Going Clear (film)
 Inside Scientology (book)
 L. Ron Hubbard: Messiah or Madman? (book)
 My Scientology Movie (film)
 Scientology and Me (TV documentary)
 Scientology: The Now Religion (book)
 The Mind Benders (book)
 The Scandal of Scientology (book)
 Auditing controversies
 Bibliography of books critical of Scientology
 Church of Scientology v. Gerald Armstrong
 Leah Remini: Scientology and the Aftermath (TV series)
 Mike Rinder, former Scientology executive and outspoken critic
 Project Chanology
 Scientology and psychiatry
 Scientology and the Internet
 Scientology and the legal system
 Scientology beliefs and practices

References

External links
"Operation Clambake" (a comprehensive archive of critical material on Scientology)
archive (Chronological list of publications on Scientology)
Dianetics Skeptic's Dictionary entry on dianetics
"Death of a Scientologist" Chicago Reader feature about the suicide of an OT7 Scientologist
EFF "Legal Cases - Church of Scientology" Archive
Owen Chris. 'The strange links between the CoS-IRS agreement and the Snow White Program', Scientology vs the IRS, (16 January 1998)

Scientology
 
Abuse of the legal system
Criticism of Scientology